Demon Turf is a 3D platformer action-adventure game developed by Fabraz and published by Playtonic Friends. The game was released November 4, 2021 on Microsoft Windows, Nintendo Switch, PlayStation 4, PlayStation 5, Xbox One, and Xbox Series X/S.

Gameplay 
Demon Turf is a platform action-adventure game set in an open world environment and played from a third-person perspective. The player takes control of Beebz, a young demon girl, and travels between four different worlds called "Turfs", each of which is separated into separate levels. The objective of every level is to find and steal a "Battery", and every level has three "Sweets" hidden in them as a secondary objective. Instead of direct combat, Beebz is able to use her projectile to push enemies off of the level or into spikes in order to defeat them. Beebz is also capable of learning new special abilities called "Turf Abilities" that expand her platforming capabilities, such as allowing her to take flight or slow time in a localized area. Demon Turf has elements of a "collectathon", with a "Photo Hunt" mode where the player is encouraged to take pictures of specific objects in the game world.

The game has no checkpoints, instead giving the player the ability to decide when and where to set one of three different Checkpoint Flags that they can teleport to and respawn at.

Development 
The game was conceived by Fabraz studio head Fabian Restorfer. Fabian said in an interview with IGN that the studio felt content that they done everything they wanted to do with 2D platformers with their previous game, Slime-san, but they were not entirely sure they fully explored everything that a platformer can be. Demon Turf started development as a 2.5D platformer, and a successor to Slime-san before being finalized into its current form. The game was programmed by Fabraz studio's head programmer, Ben Miller. It was developed using the Unity Engine.

Demon Turf Trials 
In the lead up to the launch of the full Demon Turf game, Fabraz studios released an extended demo of the game called Demon Turf Trials. In addition to containing the first three levels of the game, Demon Turf Trials also featured a special "Trials Mode" where players could compete to get the best time in specially designed weekly challenges. The player with the best time every week will get a portrait of themselves, a pet, or a family member in the Demon Turf video game.

Reception 

Demon Turf received "generally favorable" reviews for most platforms according to review aggregator Metacritic; the Windows version received "mixed or average" reviews. Nintendo World Report noted in their review that combat felt less integrated in the game then other mechanics. Destructoid was more critical, citing the art style as one of the few strong parts of the game that was also unique.

Sequel 
A followup game, Demon Turf: Neon Splash was released on April 14, 2022.

References 

2021 video games
3D platform games
Windows games
Xbox One games
Xbox Series X and Series S games
Nintendo Switch games
Photography games
PlayStation 4 games
PlayStation 5 games
Indie video games
Video games about demons
Video games developed in the United States
Video games featuring female protagonists